Os Piores Portugueses (lit. The Worst Portuguese) was a poll organized by the debate program Eixo do Mal of SIC Notícias to determine which Portuguese figures contributed the most to the country's ruin. It competed and parodied the poll for Great Portuguese (Os Grandes Portugueses). 

On 13 February 2007, António de Oliveira Salazar was named worst Portuguese ever and also the Greatest Portuguese ever as the winner of the Os Grandes Portugueses contest.

The candidates for Worst Portuguese

Lists of worsts

References
https://piorportugues.blogs.sapo.pt/